Hellingrath may refer to:

 Norbert von Hellingrath (1888–1916), German literary scholar
 Philipp von Hellingrath (1862–1939), Bavarian general and War Minister